The United States Hotel Stakes was an American Thoroughbred horse race run annually in the late summer or early autumn until 1955 at Saratoga Race Course in Saratoga Springs, New York. It was run on dirt over a distance of six furlongs. Raced in the pre-grading era, for most of its existence the race was one of the premier shorter distance competitions for two-year-old horses in the United States.

The first running of the United States Hotel Stakes took place in 1880 and was raced for three-year-olds until 1895 when it was changed to a competition for two-year-olds. The inaugural race was won by future U.S. Racing Hall of Fame inductee, Luke Blackburn. It was so successful that in 1901 the New York Times was reporting that it was a "rich" race because it offered a purse of $10,000.

While Man o' War, who would be ranked No.1 in the Blood-Horse magazine List of the Top 100 U.S. Racehorses of the 20th Century, and other great horses in the history of American Thoroughbred racing won this race, it is also notable for two notable horses who did not. In 1929, the ensuing year's U.S. Triple Crown champion and future U.S. Racing Hall of Fame inductee Gallant Fox finished second. Whirlaway, another U.S. Triple Crown champion and future U.S. Racing Hall of Fame inductee, suffered the same fate in 1940.

The last horse to win the United States Hotel Stakes was Career Boy, a colt owned by prominent horseman Cornelius Vanderbilt Whitney who went on to be voted the American Champion Male Turf Horse for 1956. The runner-up was Canadian Champ, the 1956 Canadian Horse of the Year and Canadian Horse Racing Hall of Fame inductee.

Winners of the United States Hotel Stakes

 1955 - Career Boy
 1954 - Summer Tan
 1953 - Wise Pop
 1952 - Tahitian King
 1951 - Jet Master
 1950 - Northern Star
 1949 - More Sun
 1948 - The Admiral
 1947 - My Request
 1946 - I Will
 1945 - Air Hero
 1944 - Pavot
 1943 - Boy Knight
 1942 - Devil's Thumb
 1941 - Buster
 1940 - Attention
 1939 - Flight Command
 1938 - El Chico
 1937 - Chaps
 1936 - Reaping Reward
 1935 - Postage Due
 1934 - Balladier
 1933 - Red Wagon
 1932 - Ladysman
 1931 - Morfair
 1930 - Jamestown
 1929 - Caruso
 1928 - Comstockery
 1927 - Nassak
 1926 - Scapa Flow
 1925 - Pompey
 1924 - Sunny Man
 1923 - St. James
 1922 - Martingale
 1921 - Morvich
 1920 - Nancy Lee
 1919 - Man o' War
 1918 - Billy Kelly
 1917 - Papp
 1916 - Deer Trap
 1915 - Dominant
 1914 - Garbage
 1913 - Old Rosebud
 1912 - No Race
 1911 - No Race
 1910 - Naushon
 1909 - Grasmere
 1908 - Hilarious
 1907 - Restigouche
 1906 - De Mund
 1905 - Burgomaster
 1904 - Woodsaw
 1903 - Montreson
 1902 - Skilful
 1901 - Masterman
 1900 - No race
 1899 - Kinley Mack
 1898 - George Keene
 1897 - Braw Lad
 1896 - No Race
 1895 - Axiom
 1894 - Peacemaker
 1893 - Not found
 1892 - Copyright
 1891 - Bermuda
 1890 - Sinaloa
 1889 - Retrieve
 1888 - Not found
 1887 - Hanover
 1886 - Inspector B
 1885 - Favor
 1884 - Kosciusko
 1883 - Drake Carter
 1882 - Not found
 1881 - Hindoo
 1880 - Luke Blackburn

Notes

References
 The United States Hotel Stakes at Pedigree Query

Discontinued horse races in New York (state)
Flat horse races for two-year-olds
Recurring sporting events established in 1880
Recurring sporting events disestablished in 1955
1880 establishments in New York (state)
1955 disestablishments in New York (state)